Umaanilayam is a 1984 Indian Malayalam film, directed by Joshiy. The film stars Shankar, Manochithra, Radha and Shanavas in the lead roles. The film has musical score by Shyam.

Cast
Shankar as Vinu
Manochithra as Geetha
Radha as Uma
Shanavas as Raju
Jose as Rajan
Cochin Haneefa as Gopy
Silk Smitha
Prathapachandran as Jagathnadha Varma
Kunchan as Rocky
P.K. Abraham as Shiva Shankara Pilla
Ravi Kumar

Soundtrack
The music was composed by Shyam and the lyrics were written by Poovachal Khader.

References

External links
 

1984 films
1980s Malayalam-language films
Malayalam remakes of Hindi films
Films directed by Joshiy